Asura reversa is a moth of the family Erebidae. It is found on Admiralty Island and the Dampier Archipelago.

References

reversa
Moths described in 1916
Moths of Australia